Francis Agbo (born 15 January 1958 in Adjohoun, Benin) is a French former athlete who specialised in the high jump. Agbo competed at the 1980 Summer Olympics.

References

People from Ouémé Department
French male high jumpers
Olympic athletes of France
Beninese emigrants to France
Athletes (track and field) at the 1980 Summer Olympics
1958 births
Living people